Rudnev is a surname. Notable people with the surname include:

 Konstantin Rudnev (1911–1980), Soviet politician
 Lev Rudnev (1885–1956), Soviet architect
 Nikoly Rudnev (1895–1944), Ukrainian–Uzbekistani chess master
 Vadim Rudnev (1874–1940), Russian politician and editor
 Vsevolod Rudnev (1855–1913), Russian naval officer
 Yevgeniya Rudneva (1920–1944), Soviet aviator and Hero of the Soviet Union, after whom 1907 Rudneva is named

See also
 Artjoms Rudņevs (born 1988), Latvian football forward

Russian-language surnames